Kevin O'Keeffe may refer to:
 Kevin O'Keeffe (footballer) (born 1952), Australian rules footballer
 Kevin O'Keeffe (politician) (born 1964), Irish Fianna Fáil politician